Tommaso Ceccarelli (born 2 June 1992) is an Italian footballer who plays as a winger or attacking midfielder for  club Picerno on loan from Avellino.

Career 
Ceccarelli scored 47 goals in two and a half years for Lazio's youth team and, while he trained with the senior team, did not make his professional debut until 2012, when he went on loan to Serie B side Juve Stabia.

On 1 September 2014 he was signed by L'Aquila.

In the summer of 2016 he was signed by Lupa Roma. On 27 January 2017 Ceccarelli moved to Prato, with Matteo Cavagna moving on loan in opposite direction.

On 15 July 2019, he returned to Feralpisalò.

On 20 July 2021, he joined to Catania. His contract with Catania was terminated by mutual consent on 15 January 2022.

On 20 January 2022, he returned to Juve Stabia.

On 10 August 2022, Ceccarelli signed a two-year contract with Avellino. On 5 January 2023, he was loaned by Picerno.

References

External links 

1992 births
Living people
Footballers from Rome
Italian footballers
Italy youth international footballers
Association football midfielders
Serie B players
Serie C players
S.S. Lazio players
S.S. Juve Stabia players
S.S. Virtus Lanciano 1924 players
FeralpiSalò players
L'Aquila Calcio 1927 players
Lupa Roma F.C. players
A.C. Prato players
A.C. Monza players
Catania S.S.D. players
U.S. Avellino 1912 players
AZ Picerno players